Stairway to Stardom is a public-access television series that aired in New York City from 1979 to the early 1990s. It was described by NPR as "an amateur talent show many see as a low-rent precursor to American Idol. Taped "in what appeared to be a freshly carpeted Staten Island basement," the host Frank Masi would bring on amateur singers, dancers, actresses, and comedians to perform. Describing the show, The A.V. Club's "Found Footage" segment claimed that "without exaggeration, it was one of the greatest shows ever to be on television."

Clips and full shows have appeared on the web and gained a cult following. The disco-style opening theme song was performed by Steve Luisi and All The King's Men and written by their keyboard player, Ben Stiefel.

A 2017 play performed at the HERE Arts Center was based on the series.

References

External links
 
 YouTube channel with full episodes and clips
 "The Low-Rent Appeal of 'Stairway to Stardom'", NPR segment

American public access television shows
1970s American variety television series
1980s American variety television series
1990s American variety television series
English-language television shows